Sîngerei (also spelled Sângerei) is a city in Moldova and the seat of Sîngerei District. One village is administered by the city, Vrănești.

History
During the interwar period, the city was the seat of Plasa Sângerei, in Bălți County, Romania. Between 1944 and 1991 the city was named Lazovsk, after the name of Moldovan communist Sergey Lazo.

Media
 Jurnal FM – 95.2 MHz
 Eco FM – 100.2 MHz

Notable people
 Anton Crihan
 Vasile Gafencu
 Ion Hadârcă
 Petru Hadârcă
 Vitalie Nagacevschi

International relations

Twin towns — Sister cities 
Sîngerei is twinned with:

  Hârlău, Romania

Gallery

References

Cities and towns in Moldova
Bălți County (Romania)
Sîngerei District